The Californian, also known as the California White, is a breed of domestic rabbit originally developed for the fur and meat industries by George S. West of Lynwood, California, starting in 1923. Mr. West maintained a herd of 300 genetically pure New Zealand Whites (with no Angora genes), which he began crossing with Standard Chinchilla rabbits (for their dense coat) and Himalayan rabbits (from which the Californian's markings come). His new breed, named for the state of its origin, was first shown in 1928 and a standard was accepted by the American Rabbit Breeders Association (ARBA) in 1939.

ARBA recognizes only the original "Standard" color variety of white with dark points, while the British Rabbit Council (BRC) recognizes four color varieties: "Normal", plus Chocolate, Blue, or Lilac points.

Californian rabbits have dense, plush coats.

See also

List of rabbit breeds

References

Further reading

External links
Californian Rabbit Breed History
House Rabbit Society For the care of pet rabbits
Breeds of Rabbits

Rabbits as pets
Rabbit breeds
Rabbit breeds originating in the United States